Melipotis is a genus of moths in the family Erebidae first described by Jacob Hübner in 1818.

Description
Palpi with second joint obliquely upturned and reaching vertex of head, and long porrect third joint. Antennae with short fasciculated cilia in male. Thorax and abdomen smoothly scaled. Mid and hind tibia with medial and terminal tufts of long spinous hairs. Forewings with somewhat quadrate apex.

Species
 Melipotis abrupta (Snellen, 1887)
 Melipotis acontioides (Guenée, 1852)
 Melipotis agrotoides (Walker, 1858)
 Melipotis albiterminalis (Draudt & Gaede, 1944)
 Melipotis asinus Dognin, 1912
 Melipotis brunnearis (Guenée, 1852)
 Melipotis calamioides (Snellen, 1887)
 Melipotis cellaris (Guenée, 1852)
 Melipotis comprehendens (Walker, 1858)
 Melipotis contorta (Guenée, 1852)
 Melipotis decreta (Walker, 1858)
 Melipotis dispar (Kohler, 1979)
 Melipotis euryphaea (Hampson, 1926)
 Melipotis evelina (Butler, 1878)
 Melipotis famelica (Guenée, 1852)
 Melipotis fasciolaris (Hübner, [1831])
 Melipotis fuscifusata (Hampson, 1926)
 Melipotis goniosema (Hampson, 1926)
 Melipotis guanicana Schaus, 1940
 Melipotis gubernata (Walker, 1858)
 Melipotis harrisoni Schaus, 1923
 Melipotis imparallela (Guenée, 1852)
 Melipotis indomita (Walker, 1858)
 Melipotis januaris (Guenée, 1852)
 Melipotis jucunda (Hübner, 1818)
 Melipotis leucomelana (Herrich-Schäffer, 1868)
 Melipotis lucigera (Walker, 1858)
 Melipotis mesoleuca (Walker, 1869)
 Melipotis nigrobasis (Guenée, 1852)
 Melipotis novanda (Guenée, 1852) (=Melipotis agrotipennis (Harvey, 1875))
 Melipotis obliquivia (Hampson, 1926)
 Melipotis ochrodes (Guenée, 1852)
 Melipotis perpendicularis (Guenée, 1852)
 Melipotis prolata (Walker, 1858)
 Melipotis prunescens (Hampson, 1926)
 Melipotis punctifinis (Hampson, 1926)
 Melipotis recipiens (Walker, 1858)
 Melipotis roseata (Draudt & Gaede, 1944)
 Melipotis separata (Walker, 1858)
 Melipotis strigifera (Walker, 1858)
 Melipotis trujillensis Dognin, 1912
 Melipotis tucumanensis Dognin, 1912
 Melipotis walkeri Butler, 1892

Former species
 Melipotis albisigna (Wileman & South, 1920)
 Melipotis amphix (Cramer, [1777])
 Melipotis diascota (Hampson, 1916)
 Melipotis grandidieri (Viette, 1968)
 Melipotis melanoschista (Meyrick, 1897)
 Melipotis metaleuca (Hampson, 1896)
 Melipotis mimica (Gaede, 1939)
 Melipotis phaeocrossa (Turner, 1932)
 Melipotis unilinea (Swinhoe, 1885)
 Melipotis voeltzkowi (Viette, 1965)

References

 
 

 
Melipotini
Moth genera